Eye of the Beholder III: Assault on Myth Drannor is a 1993 role-playing video game and the sequel to Eye of the Beholder and Eye of the Beholder II: The Legend of Darkmoon.

Plot
After defeating Dran the heroes tell the patrons of a local tavern about their success over Dran Draggore and how it saved the town. After that, a mysterious man enters the tavern and asks the heroes to save the ruined city, Myth Drannor, which is ruled by a Lich named Acwellan. The man then tells the heroes that they need to save Myth Drannor by getting an ancient artifact from the Lich known as the Codex. After the heroes accept the quest, the mysterious man teleports the heroes just outside Myth Drannor.

The explorable areas include the forest around the city, the mausoleum, and finally the city ruins including a mage guild and a temple.

Gameplay
Despite employing an updated version of the engine, interesting and oft-unique NPC selection and welcome gameplay tweaks such as an 'All Attack' button and the ability to use polearms from second rank, it was not well received.

Development
Eye of the Beholder III: Assault on Myth Drannor was not developed by Westwood, the developer of Eye of the Beholder and The Legend of Darkmoon, but rather in-house by the publisher SSI. Westwood had been acquired by Virgin Interactive in 1992 and they created the Lands of Lore series instead.

The game uses the AESOP engine which later used in Dungeon Hack. Both games share the same enemy sprites, graphics, and sound effects.

Reception
SSI sold 50,664 copies of Eye of the Beholder III. The Eye of the Beholder series overall, including the game's two predecessors, reached combined global sales above 350,000 units by 1996. GameSpy commented that "Eye of the Beholder III was a classic example of a company churning out a quick sequel to a good game and simply not giving it the love and care it really deserves". Computer Gaming Worlds Scorpia wrote that since the game "is the closeout of the EOB series, one would expect it to be on the spectacular side. Unfortunately, for several reasons, that isn't the case". She stated that the graphics were inferior to the previous games', that "Aurally, the game is a nightmare", and that the "big fight at the end is a letdown". Scorpia concluded that "Assault on Myth Drannor is a disappointment ... [it] just doesn't stack up against the previous two games. What started as a series with great promise has, alas, ended on a mediocre note". She later called the game "dreary" with a "letdown" of an ending, and "only for the hard-core EOB player. (Note: Westwood had nothing to do with it.)"

Reviews
ASM (Aktueller Software Markt) - Jun, 1993
PC Player (Germany) - Jul, 1993
PC Games - Jun, 1993
PC Format - Dec, 1994

References

External links
Eye of the Beholder III: Assault on Myth Drannor at MobyGames

1993 video games
DOS games
FM Towns games
First-person party-based dungeon crawler video games
Forgotten Realms video games
NEC PC-9801 games
Role-playing video games
Single-player video games
Strategic Simulations games
Video games developed in the United States
Video games featuring protagonists of selectable gender